DAZN ("da zone") is an international over-the-top sports streaming service owned by DAZN Group, which is majority owned by Access Industries. 

The company began operations in 2016 under the ownership of Perform Group, anchored by its purchase of global media rights to Japan's J.League football. It initially launched in Austria, Germany, and Switzerland on 10 August 2016, followed by Japan on 23 August 2016. The service expanded to Canada in 2017 (with a focus on streaming rights to the National Football League). After hiring former ESPN president John Skipper, DAZN expanded into the United States in 2018 with a focus on boxing, including major broadcast agreements with promoter Eddie Hearn and Mexican boxer Canelo Álvarez.

In 2018, DAZN and Perform Group's content business was spun off as DAZN Group, with its sports data business later sold to Vista Equity Partners, who merged it with STATS LLC to form Stats Perform. In 2020, DAZN announced plans to expand worldwide, with a focus on its portfolio of global broadcast rights such as boxing, and original content.

History 
Prior to its launch, Perform Group announced its acquisition of exclusive worldwide media rights to Japanese J.League football under a 10-year, ¥210 billion (US$2 billion) contract, succeeding a ¥5 billion deal with SKY Perfect. Under the contract, all matches from the three J.League divisions (J1, J2, and J3) would be broadcast by DAZN beginning in 2017. The league described the contract as being the largest broadcast rights deal in the history of Japanese sport.

DAZN first launched in Austria, Germany, and Switzerland on 10 August 2016, closely followed by Japan on 23 August 2016.

In February 2018, DAZN sub-licensed Japanese rights to the B.League, Nippon Professional Baseball, La Liga, and the Premier League from Softbank, after the company announced that it would shut down its Sportsnavi Live service at the end of May. As part of the arrangement, DAZN offered a promotional offer for former Sportsnavi customers.

Canadian launch 
In July 2017, DAZN announced that it would expand into Canada, after having acquired OTT streaming rights to the National Football League in Canada, including NFL Game Pass and access to NFL RedZone; as a result of the deal, television providers would no longer sell the out-of-market sports package NFL Sunday Ticket to residential customers. The DAZN deal does not affect the NFL's newly extended linear television rights deal with Bell Media. On 8 August 2017, DAZN reached a deal to sublicense content from beIN Sports Canada, including selected UEFA Champions League and UEFA Europa League matches (themselves sub-licensed from TSN), as well as other international sports rights.

The Canadian launch was met with technical issues; DAZN apologized for the "inadequate service" that it delivered, and stated that it was working to rectify them. However, users still reported problems, including inconsistent stream qualities, buffering, and latency between the streams and television broadcasts. As a result, DAZN began to distribute NFL Sunday Ticket to television providers in October 2017, as had been the case before. On 20 November 2017, DAZN acquired Canadian rights to FIBA events.

In February 2018, DAZN acquired Canadian broadcast rights to the 2018 Commonwealth Games (later sub-licensing portions of the coverage to CBC Sports), and subsumed Major League Soccer's digital out-of-market service MLS Live — with live and on-demand streaming of matches featuring U.S. teams (matches with Canadian teams will only be available after a 48-hour delay to protect the league's main rightsholders TSN and TVA Sports). Roku support was also added that month. In March, DAZN reached a syndication deal to carry content from Pac-12 Network on the service in Canada.

On 25 May 2018, DAZN announced that it had acquired exclusive Canadian rights to the UEFA Champions League and Europa League, beginning in the 2018–19 season and replacing TSN. In April 2019, DAZN announced that it had acquired Canadian rights to the Premier League, replacing Sportsnet and TSN, under a three-year deal.

U.S. launch & combat sports 
On 8 May 2018, DAZN announced that it had hired former ESPN president John Skipper as executive chairman. Skipper stated that he eventually wanted DAZN to compete directly with traditional U.S. cable sports networks (such as ESPN).

Two days later, DAZN announced that it would launch in the United States, and that it had reached a major broadcasting deal with Eddie Hearn's Matchroom Sport. Under the deal, DAZN streams 32 cards per-year, including 16 British Sky Sports Box Office cards, as well as 16 held in the United States (described by Hearn as being "twelve massive shows and four absolute monsters"). Hearn claimed that the deal, which would last for at least two years, with an option for a six-year extension (totalling US$1 billion over the life of the contract if realised), was a "groundbreaking deal in the history of boxing".

On 26 June 2018, DAZN announced a five-year streaming rights deal with the Viacom-owned mixed martial arts promotion Bellator, which began with Bellator 206 on 29 September 2018, and includes the U.S. and all other regions currently served by DAZN. The rights include seven exclusive events per-year, as well as all events televised by Paramount Network.

DAZN officially launched in the U.S. in September 2018, ahead of its first boxing event—Anthony Joshua vs. Alexander Povetkin, on 22 September. Its launch content also included the World Boxing Super Series, as well as the AFC Champions League, the Chilean Primera Division, J-League and other content. DAZN's broadcast team for its U.S. boxing events is led by "Sugar" Ray Leonard and Brian Kenny on play-by-play, with LZ Granderson as ringside reporter, and Michael Buffer as ring announcer. Buffer appeared in a U.S. marketing campaign for the service, contrasting its business model to pay-per-views.

In September 2018, DAZN's parent company Perform Group underwent a reorganization, with its sports data business spun into a second company known as Perform Content (which was later sold to Vista Equity Partners and merged with STATS LLC in 2019 to form Stats Perform), and its consumer properties (including DAZN itself, as well as several co-owned sports news websites) retained as DAZN Group.

On 17 October 2018, DAZN announced that it had signed a five-year, 11-fight deal with Mexican boxer Canelo Álvarez valued at a minimum of $365 million, beginning with his then-upcoming bout against Rocky Fielding in December for the WBA super middleweight title. Álvarez was previously aligned with HBO, which had announced that it would discontinue boxing broadcasts. The contract overtook Giancarlo Stanton's $325 million contract with the Miami Marlins as the highest-valued contract with a single athlete in sport known at the time (since overtaken by Mike Trout's 10-year, near-$430 million contract with the Los Angeles Angels in 2019, Patrick Mahomes' 12-year, near-$503 million contract with Kansas City Chiefs in 2020, and Lionel Messi's 4-year, near-$673 million contract with FC Barcelona in 2017, revealed in 2021).

In December 2018, DAZN was estimated to be worth £3 billion: it was described by the Evening Standard as one of the United Kingdom's few tech "unicorns".

In November 2018, Major League Baseball announced a three-year content partnership with DAZN, which includes on-demand highlights, and ChangeUp—a live nightly studio program featuring look-ins and analysis. Hosted by former ESPN Baseball Tonight anchor Adnan Virk. it was described by executive producer Logan Swaim as stylistically mixing elements of NFL RedZone and his previous role Good Morning Football, and considered part of a goal to offer more content relating to mainstream, non-combat sports. Just before the start of the 2020 season, DAZN canceled MLB-related programming due to financial stresses caused by the COVID-19 pandemic.

European & Asian expansion 
DAZN launched in Italy in August 2018, with an acquisition of exclusive rights to 114 Serie A matches beginning in the 2018–19 season (with Sky Italia holding rights to 266), and other domestic rights on launch including the European Rugby Champions Cup, Showtime Championship Boxing, UFC programming, and the World Rally Championship, alongside DAZN's global rights portfolio. The following September, DAZN announced that in order to improve the accessibility of its Serie A rights (especially in regions where internet service quality is insufficient for using DAZN), it would begin to offer a subscription-based linear channel on Sky Italia's satellite service, carrying selected content from the service (including its Serie A rights).

In January 2019, DAZN acquired the rights to broadcast the 2019 AFC Asian Cup in Canada and the United States, beginning with the quarter-finals. In March 2019, DAZN doubled its U.S. monthly cost, but also introduced a new yearly option at a discount.

DAZN launched in Spain in February 2019, becoming its eighth market. The service went live with a roster of exclusive premium sport content including MotoGP, Moto 2 and Moto3 (2019–2022), EuroLeague (2019/20–2022/23), EuroCup and Premier League (2019/20 to 2024/25). Other rights included FA Cup, EFL Cup, Coppa Italia and Supercoppa Italiana, EFL Championship, UFC, Golden Boy, Matchroom Boxing, and PDC Darts.

On 8 March 2019, DAZN signed a three-year, six-fight deal with Gennady Golovkin, under which it would broadcast two fights per-year. The contract also includes two cards per-year from Golovkin's GGG Promotions beginning in 2020. The deal began with his June 2019 bout against Canadian boxer Steve Rolls: Golovkin's promoter explained that the choice of a Canadian boxer was intended to help encourage DAZN subscriptions in the country. Golovkin cited the broadcaster's "global vision" as an influence on the decision.

In May 2019, former ESPN and Fox Sports executive Jamie Horowitz (who was known for having placed a large focus on debate-driven studio programs during his tenures at both networks) became DAZN's head of content. Also that month, the service announced an expansion into Brazil as its ninth market (and first in South America), acquiring rights to the Copa Sudamericana and Campeonato Brasileiro Série C, and other international football competitions among other properties.

In July 2019, DAZN's then CEO Simon Denyer told Bloomberg News that the company was interested in pursuing rights to the NFL in the United States to some degree (the NFL Sunday Ticket out-of-market package is currently exclusive to DirecTV). That month, DAZN also reached a syndication deal with Eurosport in Austria, Germany, Italy, and Spain, allowing DAZN subscribers to access live and on-demand sports programming from Eurosport in these regions. In addition, DAZN sub-licensed 45 Bundesliga matches from Eurosport in Germany and Austria over the next two seasons — with 39 exclusive to the service.

In October 2019, mobile analytics firm SensorTower listed DAZN as having overtaken Major League Baseball as the highest-grossing sports-related mobile app in the first half of 2019 in terms of worldwide revenue on application storefronts.

Global launch 
On 2 March 2020, DAZN announced that it would expand into 200 additional countries worldwide, with an initial focus on giving wider distribution to its boxing and original content portfolio. The launch was originally scheduled for 2 May 2020, but was rescheduled to 24 July, before ultimately launching on 1 December (coinciding with Ryan Garcia vs. Luke Campbell. DAZN EVP of Global Brand Joe Markowski told Finder that the global launch was about "getting a foot in the door", and that further investments (such as domestic broadcast rights) would depend on the service being "taken up in high numbers, and exceeding our expectations. Then [when] we have local content opportunities that make sense for us and our board economically, we're going to really get started."

With the COVID-19 pandemic resulting in widespread suspension of international sport, DAZN stated in late-March 2020 that it would not pay rightsholders for content that had not been delivered under their contracts.

In September 2020, DAZN extended their carriage agreement with Eurosport through August 2023, and added Switzerland to the agreement.

In January 2021, the DAZN linear channels were added to Spanish television service Movistar+. That month, former Entain CEO Shay Segev was named the new CEO of DAZN , after having acted alongside founder James Rushton for the previous six months. In March 2021, senior adviser to Access Industries and former Walt Disney Direct-to-Consumer & International executive Kevin A. Mayer became the chairman of DAZN, replacing John Skipper.

In June 2021, DAZN announced a five-year agreement with Matchroom Boxing in the UK and Ireland beginning 31 July, ending the promotion's long-term association with Sky Sports. It also announced a four-year global broadcasting deal for the UEFA Women's Champions League (outside of China, the Middle East, and North Africa) under which it will partner with YouTube to simulcast 61 matches during the 2021–22 and 2022–23 seasons (after which YouTube will stream 19 matches per-season, with the remainder exclusive to DAZN).

In February 2022, DAZN began a foray into non-fungible tokens (NFTs) in partnership with Mixi, known as "DAZN Moments", in partnership with the J League. In July 2022, DAZN expanded this operation into a global "DAZN Boxing" NFT marketplace, which is based on highlights from DAZN boxing matches.

In April 2022, DAZN announced a partnership with Pragmatic Group to operate sports betting services under the DAZN Bet banner..

In May 2022, DAZN signed a deal to carry Red Bull TV, including live and on-demand content. DAZN also signed a four-event deal with KSI's Misfits Boxing, carrying cards under the branding "MF & DAZN: X Series": their first PPV was held on 27 August 2022. 

In June 2022, DAZN announced a global broadcasting deal with British boxer Anthony Joshua, beginning with his 20 August rematch against Oleksandr Usyk in Saudi Arabia; the deal was reported to be valued at £100 million per-year, with Joshua also becoming a brand ambassador for DAZN.

In July 2022, Segev stated that there were plans to add more interactive features to the platform, such as "watch parties", alternative broadcasts of events, and sports betting integration. In September 2022, after an attempted pursuit of British sports network BT Sport, DAZN announced that it would acquire sports broadcaster Eleven Group, expanding its position in parts of Asia and Europe, and in global sports streaming rights and technologies. The acquisitions was later finalized on February 16, 2023.

In January 2023, DAZN signed a five-year deal with KSI and Misfits Boxing (covering all KSI bouts, and six X Series cards per-year, with two on PPV), and a multi-year agreement with All Elite Wrestling (AEW) to carry its programming in 42 Asian and European territories. In February 2023, DAZN announced that it had acquired the global rights to the NFL's Game Pass service outside of the U.S. and China under a 10-year deal beginning in the 2023 NFL season; it will be sold as a standalone subscription service on the DAZN platform.

Programming

Sports rights 
Noted sports rights held by DAZN include:

Other sports rights 
Sports rights which are sublicensed to other broadcasters and global DAZN rights:

 Association football
 La Liga
 Vietnam: Sublicensed to SCTV.
 Coupe de France: DAZN has rights in Asian countries.
 UEFA Women's Champions League: DAZN has global exclusively rights.
 Liga F: DAZN has global exclusively rights.
 Women's Super League: DAZN has rights in some countries.
 Women's FA Cup: DAZN has rights in some countries.
 Women's FA Community Shield: DAZN has rights in some countries.
 Women's International Champions Cup: DAZN has rights in over 175 countries.

 American football
 National Football League: DAZN has global rights.

 3x3 basketball
 BIG3: DAZN has global rights.

 Basketball
 National Basketball League: DAZN has rights in Europe.

 Chess
 Champions Chess Tour: DAZN has global rights.

 Combat sports
 Golden Boy Promotions: DAZN has global exclusively rights.
 Matchroom Boxing: DAZN has global exclusively rights.
 Misfits Boxing: DAZN has global exclusively rights.
 Brave Combat Federation: DAZN has global rights.
 Naciones MMA: DAZN has global rights.
 Hexagone MMA: DAZN has global rights.
 United Boxing Promotions: DAZN has rights in over 180 countries.
 Muay Thai For Life: DAZN has global rights.
 Ansgar Fighting League: DAZN has global rights.
 King of Kings: DAZN has global rights.
 Bushido MMA: DAZN has global rights.
 Dream Boxing: DAZN has global rights.
 PFL Europe: DAZN has rights in Europe.
 Red Owl Boxing: DAZN has global rights.
 Overtime Boxing: DAZN has global exclusively rights.
 Oktagon MMA: DAZN has global rights.

 eSports
 BLAST Premier: DAZN has rights in over 100 countries.

 Indoor football
 Fan Controlled Football: DAZN has global rights.

 Motorsport
 Formula E: DAZN has rights in 13 countries.
 Extreme E: DAZN has rights in over 150 countries.
 Nitro Rallycross: DAZN has global rights.
 eSkootr Championship: DAZN has global rights.
 World Supercross Championship: DAZN has global rights.

 Multi-sport
 Summer Olympic Games: DAZN has rights in Hong Kong.
 Maccabiah Games: DAZN has global rights.

 Professional wrestling
 Kinguin Prime Time Wrestling: DAZN has global rights.
 All Elite Wrestling: DAZN has rights in some countries.
 IMPACT Wrestling: DAZN has rights in 170 countries.

 Skateboarding
 Street League Skateboarding: DAZN has rights in some countries.

 Triathlon
 PTO Tour: DAZN has rights in some countries.
 Super League Triathlon: DAZN has global rights.

Linear channels 
Linear channels on DAZN include:

Red Bull TV and Unbeaten available globally.

Original content 
In April 2019, DAZN premiered a new, candid camera esque show, Da Pull Up, hosted by Akin "Ak" Reyes and Barak Bess, and premiered the first episode of 40 Days - docuseries chronicling the lead-up to Canelo Álvarez's bout against Daniel Jacobs.

In July 2019, former Indianapolis Colts punter and WWE personality Pat McAfee signed a content deal with DAZN, which added television simulcasts of his podcast and new syndicated, daily radio show to the service, as well as contributions to shoulder content for DAZN's NFL rights. DAZN and Pat McAfee terminated their broadcast partnership in May 2020.

Device support 
DAZN supports online streaming on personal computers, as well as mobile apps on Android and iOS, digital media players and smart TVs, and video game consoles.

In September 2019, Comcast reached a deal with DAZN to offer an app for the service its Xfinity X1 cable boxes, becoming the first U.S. television provider to offer support for the service within their platform.

See also 
 Eleven Sports
 ESPN+
 NBC Sports Gold
 GolfTV
 UFC Fight Pass
 WWE Network
 NBA League Pass
 NFL Game Pass
 Red Bull TV
 FITE TV
 FloSports
 OneSoccer
 List of streaming media services

Notes

References

External links 
Official website

Internet television channels
Football mass media in Germany
Sports television in Germany
Sports television networks
Subscription video streaming services
Internet properties established in 2015
2015 establishments in England
2015 establishments in the United Kingdom